Heinz Barmettler Veloz (born 21 July 1987) is a retired professional footballer who played as a central defender. Born in Switzerland, he represented the Dominican Republic internationally.

Club career
Barmettler was born in Zurich, Switzerland to a Swiss father and a Dominican mother. His father, Heinz Barmettler Sr., is a vice-president of FC Blue Stars Zürich.

Barmettler was part of the 2006–07 Swiss Championship winning team FC Zürich.

On 12 July 2012 Barmettler joined Inter Baku on a two-year contract.
On 7 January 2013, he moved to FC Vaduz on a 6-month contract, with the option of another 2 years, on a free transfer.

On 2 August 2013 following a successful trial period in the summer with Real Valladolid, the club have opted to sign Barmettler on a two-year contract, making him the first Dominican player to play in La Liga. He made his debut in the competition on the 24th, playing the full 90 minutes in a 1–2 away loss against Villarreal CF.

On 14 July 2014 Barmettler rescinded with the Pucelanos, after their relegation. On 4 March of the following year he returned to his homeland, being presented at Cibao FC.

International career
On 14 November 2009, Barmettler had made his international debut for Switzerland in the 0–1 home loss to Norway, playing the full 90 minutes. However, as the match was friendly and in addition he was never called after that date, Barmettler chose to change his FIFA nationality into Dominican Republic in 2012.

His first match with the Dominican national team was in the 2012 Caribbean Championship. He debuted on 24 September of that year in a 2–2 draw against Aruba. He was the captain of the Dominican national team.

Career statistics

References

Cibao FC profile

External links

1987 births
Living people
Footballers from Zürich
Citizens of the Dominican Republic through descent
Dominican Republic footballers
Dominican Republic international footballers
Swiss men's footballers
Switzerland international footballers
Switzerland under-21 international footballers
Swiss people of Dominican Republic descent
Sportspeople of Dominican Republic descent
Dominican Republic people of Swiss descent
Dual internationalists (football)
Association football defenders
Swiss Super League players
Grasshopper Club Zürich players
FC Zürich players
Shamakhi FK players
FC Vaduz players
Swiss expatriate sportspeople in Liechtenstein
Expatriate footballers in Liechtenstein
La Liga players
Real Valladolid players
Liga Dominicana de Fútbol players
Cibao FC players
Swiss expatriate sportspeople in Spain
Swiss expatriate sportspeople in Germany
Dominican Republic expatriate footballers
Swiss expatriate footballers
Expatriate footballers in Switzerland
Expatriate footballers in Azerbaijan
Expatriate footballers in Spain
Expatriate footballers in Germany
Dominican Republic expatriate sportspeople in Spain